The Salakovac Hydro Power Plant is one of Bosnia and Herzegovina's largest hydro power plants having an installed electric capacity of 210 MW.

References

Hydroelectric power stations in Bosnia and Herzegovina